Cyclobutyrol is a drug used in bile therapy. Cyclobutyrol (CB) is a choleretic agent which also inhibits biliary lipids secretion.

References 

 

Beta hydroxy acids
Cyclohexanols